There are over 100 waterfalls in the U.S. state of Washington.

See also 
List of lakes of the Alpine Lakes Wilderness

Washington
Waterfalls